Ignata is a Neotropical genus of butterflies in the family Lycaenidae.

Species
Ignata mulsus (Druce, 1907)
Ignata elana (Hewitson, 1874)
Ignata gadira (Hewitson, 1867)
Ignata brasiliensis (Talbot, 1928)
Ignata norax (Godman & Salvin, [1887])
Ignata levis (Druce, 1907)

References

Eumaeini
Lycaenidae of South America
Lycaenidae genera